Arta calidalis is a species of snout moth in the genus Arta. It was described by George Hampson in 1906, and is known from Guatemala and Paraguay.

References

Chrysauginae
Moths of Central America
Pyralidae of South America
Insects of Central America
Invertebrates of Paraguay
Moths described in 1906
Taxa named by George Hampson